Austria was the host nation for the 1976 Winter Olympics in Innsbruck.  It was the second time that Austria had hosted the Winter Games, after the 1964 Winter Olympics, also in Innsbruck.

Medalists

Alpine skiing

Men

Women

Biathlon

Men

 1 One minute added per close miss (a hit in the outer ring), two minutes added per complete miss.

Men's 4 x 7.5 km relay

 2 A penalty loop of 200 metres had to be skied per missed target.

Bobsleigh

Cross-country skiing

Men

Men's 4 × 10 km relay

Women

Figure skating

Men

Women

Pairs

Ice Dancing

Ice hockey

First round
Winners (in bold) entered the Medal Round. Other teams played a consolation round for 7th-12th places.

|}

Consolation Round

Austria 6-2 Bulgaria
Austria 3-2 Japan
Austria 3-4 Romania
Austria 3-5 Switzerland
Austria 3-1 Yugoslavia

Luge

Men

(Men's) Doubles

Women

Nordic combined 

Events:
 normal hill ski jumping 
 15 km cross-country skiing

Ski jumping

Speed skating

Men

References
Official Olympic Reports
International Olympic Committee results database
 Olympic Winter Games 1976, full results by sports-reference.com

Nations at the 1976 Winter Olympics
1976
Summer Olympics